Nicolas Beaudan (born 13 December 1975 in Clermont-Ferrand) is a French foil fencer. His nickname is the "black cat". He began fencing when he was eight years old. He is licensed at the Masque de Fer de Lyon. 

After spending eight years at the French National Institute of Sport and Physical Education (INSEP), he left in 2004, wanting better results, despite a team gold medal at the European Fencing Championships in 2002. 

In 2005, he joined the French team and was selected for the 2005 World Fencing Championships which took place in Leipzig. He won an individual bronze medal and a team gold medal with his teammates Erwann Le Péchoux, Victor Sintès, and Brice Guyart, an Olympic gold medalist.

In 2006, he won another team gold medal at the 2006 World Fencing Championships in Turin with Erwann Le Péchoux, Marcel Marcilloux, and Loïc Attely.

In 2007, he won a third consecutive team gold medal at the 2007 World Fencing Championships in Saint Petersburg with Le Péchoux, Marcel Marcilloux, and Brice Guyart.

External links
Profile of Nicolas Beaudan on the website for the French Fencing Federation (Fédération Française d'escrime, FFE)

French male foil fencers
1975 births
Living people
Sportspeople from Clermont-Ferrand